Office for Visual Interaction (OVI) is an architectural lighting design firm founded in 1997 by Jean Sundin and Enrique Peiniger. Based in New York City, OVI specializes in lighting & daylighting design for international projects of varying scales and types, including urban master plans, cultural and civic buildings, hospitality works, and product design. OVI's design philosophy is such that light is treated as a primary architectural component, transforming spaces through its interactions with surfaces, volumes and materials. OVI is known for their visual storytelling, “approach[ing] their projects with an investigative line of inquiry, asking questions whose answers reveal the project’s underlying narrative.”

Office for Visual Interaction has won numerous awards for their work on architectural projects such as The New York Times Building, Scottish Parliament Building, The Rookery, The United States Air Force Memorial and KAPSARC (The King Abdullah Petroleum Research Center). They have collaborated with acclaimed architects worldwide, including Zaha Hadid Architects, Foster and Partners, Enric Miralles (EMBT), Grimshaw Architects, Morphosis, and Adrian Smith + Gordon Gill Architecture.

Product Design 
In addition to their architectural work, OVI partners with manufacturers to develop custom luminaires.

In 2004, Office for Visual Interaction won an international design competition to create a new standard streetlight for New York City. Launched by New York City's Department of Design and Construction, together with the New York City Department of Transportation, the “Citylights Competition”, drew over 200 entries from 23 countries. OVI began testing and fabrication in 2008 and in 2011, the initial LED streetlight prototypes—the first of their kind for New York City—were installed near City Hall in downtown Manhattan. Expansion continued in Times Square and with a 63-fixture installation on 125th street in Harlem, as part of the city's application of energy-efficient technology to optimize and green city operations. The design is the official streetlight for the City of New York in all five boroughs.

Publications 
OVI's work has been featured internationally in architectural, design, and lighting publications. In 2010, OVI's design process was showcased in the first solo lighting exhibition at the Aedes Architecture Forum in Berlin. Entitled “Lighting Powers of 10,” the exhibition documented OVI's design philosophy and methodology. Inspired by the Charles and Ray Eames films “Powers of Ten,” which depicts the relative scale of the Universe based on a factor of ten, OVI translated this idea to the architecture and lighting design industry.

In 2013, Office for Visual Interaction published the book, “Lighting Design & Process.” Printed in English and Chinese, the book was designed and illustrated with 400+ images, sketches, illustrations and graphics and was conceived as a companion to the art and science of lighting design, as well as an account of OVI's projects worldwide.

Select Works 
 7132 Hotel Vals, Vals, Switzerland, 2020
 Canadian Parliament - West Block, Ottawa, Canada, 2019
 520 West 28th Street, New York, New York, United States, 2017
 Meixi Urban Helix, Changsha, China, 2017
 King Abdullah Petroleum Studies and Research Center (KAPSARC), Riyadh, Saudi Arabia, 2017
 Brickell City Centre, Miami, Florida, United States, 2016
 Presidential Library of Kazakhstan (Nazarbayev Center), Astana, Kazakhstan, 2014
 Canadian Museum for Human Rights, Winnipeg, Manitoba, Canada, 2014
 Perot Museum of Nature and Science, Dallas, Texas, United States, 2013
 Al Hamra Fidrous Tower, Kuwait City, Kuwait, 2012
 The Rookery, Chicago, Illinois, United States, 2011 (Exterior Lighting)
 New York City Streetlight, New York, New York, United States, 2004-2008
 The New York Times Building and The TimesCenter, New York, New York, United States, 2008
 Experimental Media and Performing Arts Center (EMPAC), Troy, NY, 2008
 Museo del Acero - Museum of Steel, Monterrey, Mexico, 2007
 C.V. Starr East Asian Library, Berkeley, California, United States, 2007
 The United States Air Force Memorial, Arlington, Virginia, United States, 2006
 Museum of Modern Art (MOMA) Design Store, New York, New York, United States, 2005
 The Scottish Parliament Building, Edinburgh, Scotland, 2004
 Lois and Richard Rosenthal Center for Contemporary Art, Cincinnati, Ohio, United States, 2003
 Bergisel Ski Jump, Innsbruck, Austria, 2002

Select Awards 
 Jovie LED, German Design Awards, Excellent Product Design-Lighting, 2019
 Meixi Urban Helix, IALD Award of Excellence, 2019
 The Rookery Building, World Architecture News Lighting Project of 2012
 New York City Streetlight, Architect Magazine Research + Development Award, 2014
 The New York Times Building, IALD Award of Merit, 2009
 Museo de Acero (Museum of Steel), AIA Award of Honor, 2009
 US Air Force Memorial, IES Lumen Award for Lighting Design and Innovation; Award of Distinction, 2008
 Phaeno Science Center, RIBA European Award Winners, European Cultural Building of the Year, 2006
 The Scottish Parliament, Stirling Prize, 2005
 Lois And Richard Rosenthal Centre For Contemporary Art, RIBA Worldwide Award, 2004
 Bergisel Ski Jump, International Olympic Committee Austrian Decoration of Science and Art, 2002

References

Lighting designers
1997 establishments in the United States
Organizations based in New York City